Physical Education Complex is a 4,100-seat multi-purpose arena in Baltimore, Maryland. It was built in 2009 and became home to the Coppin State University men's basketball team in the 2009–2010 season. The women's basketball team and women's volleyball team also play at the facility. The arena replaced the Coppin Center.

See also
 List of NCAA Division I basketball arenas

References

External links
Coppin State Sports

College basketball venues in the United States
College volleyball venues in the United States
Sports venues in Maryland
Indoor arenas in Maryland
Coppin State Eagles men's basketball
Basketball venues in Maryland